The 1861 Confederate States presidential election of November 6, 1861, was the only presidential election held under the Permanent Constitution of the Confederate States of America. Jefferson Davis, who had been elected president and Alexander H. Stephens, who had been elected vice president, under the Provisional Constitution, were elected to six-year terms that would have lasted from February 22, 1862 until February 22, 1868. In fact, both Davis and Stephens' offices were abolished on May 5, 1865 when the Confederate government dissolved.

Background 
The Provisional Congress of the Confederate States met at Montgomery, Alabama, on February 4, 1861. They adopted a provisional constitution on February 8, 1861.

On February 9, 1861, Jefferson Davis was elected Provisional President and Alexander H. Stephens was elected Provisional Vice President. Stephens took office on February 11 and Davis took office on February 18, 1861.
On March 11, 1861, a permanent Constitution was adopted.

Constitutional Provisions
Article II Section 1(1) reads: "The executive power shall be vested in a President of the Confederate States of America. He and the Vice President shall hold their offices for the term of six years; but the President shall not be re-eligible."

Article II Section 1(7) of the Confederate Constitution provides citizenship to people "born in the United States prior to the 20th of December, 1860" and also requires candidates for the President of the Confederacy to have resided "within the limits of the Confederate States" for 14 years.Article VII Section 1(2) includes instructions for electing permanent officials after the ratification of the Confederate Constitution:
When five states shall have ratified this Constitution, in the manner before specified, the Congress under the Provisional Constitution, shall prescribe the time for holding the election of President and Vice President; and, for the meeting of the Electoral College; and, for counting the votes, and inaugurating the President.

Legislation
On May 21, 1861, the Congress of the Confederacy passed "An Act to put in operation the Government under the Permanent Constitution of the Confederate States of America". It includes the following provisions:

 Section 1. ... And on [the first Wednesday in November, eighteen hundred and sixty-one] the several states shall elect or appoint Electors for President and Vice President of the Confederate States of America, according to said Constitution, and in the manner prescribed by the laws of the several States made for that purpose; and in states where no such laws may exist, according to the laws heretofore in force in such states for the election or appointment of Electors for President and Vice President of the United States.

        Sec. 2. The Electors for President and Vice President shall meet in their respective states on the first Wednesday in December, eighteen hundred and sixty-one, and proceed to vote for President and Vice President, and make out lists, certify the same, and forward the same to the President of the Senate; all as directed by the said Constitution in that behalf.

         Sec. 3. The members of the House of Representatives so elected, and the Senators who may be elected by the several states according to the provisions of said Constitution, shall assemble at the seat of government of the Confederate States, on the eighteenth day of February, eighteen hundred and sixty-two; ... and the President of the Senate shall, on the nineteenth day of February, eighteen hundred and sixty-two, open all the certificates; and the votes for President and Vice President shall then be counted, as directed by said Constitution.

         Sec. 4. The President of the Confederate States shall be inaugurated on the twenty-second day of February, eighteen hundred and sixty-two.  

General election

Campaign
Davis and Stephens ran without opposition.

Results
The election effectively confirmed the decision that had been made by the Provisional Confederate Congress earlier in the year.

Davis remained President until May 5, 1865, when the Confederate government was officially dissolved.Source (Popular Vote): CSA President - Popular Vote. Our Campaigns. (August 30, 2012).Source (Electoral Vote):' CSA President. Our Campaigns. (August 30, 2012).

(a) Totals reflect the popular vote in North Carolina only.(b) Missouri and Kentucky did not participate in this election. Missouri was admitted November 28, 1861, and Kentucky December 10, 1861.''

Electoral College

The Confederate States Electoral College was the institution that elected the president (Jefferson Davis) and vice president (Alexander H. Stephens) for a six-year term without possibility of re-election for the president.

The president and vice president were not elected directly by the voters. Instead, they were elected by electors who were chosen by popular vote on a state-by-state basis, with the exception of South Carolina, where the electors were chosen by the state legislature. This system was established by the Constitution of the Confederate States, in emulation of the United States Constitution. Like the U.S. Constitution, the Confederate Constitution provided that each state would have a number of electors "equal to the whole number of Senators and Representatives to which the State may be entitled in the Congress" (Article II, Section 1).

The Electoral College consisted of 109 electors. The electors (chosen in the November 6 elections) met in their respective states to cast their votes on December 4, 1861 (Confederate law mandated that electors meet on the first Wednesday in December). The Congress met in joint session on February 19, 1862 and certified the result. Davis and Stephens were inaugurated on February 22, 1862.

Key dates

Official sources
Journal of the Congress of the Confederate States of America, 1861–1865 [Volume 5], Journal of the House of Representatives of the First Congress of the Confederate States of America, Second Day—Wednesday, February 19, 1862, page 12 and page 13

References 

1861 elections in North America
Presidential election
Elections by former country
Electoral colleges
Jefferson Davis
Non-partisan elections
November 1861 events
Political history of the Confederate States of America
Presidential elections
Vice presidential elections